Kent Schoolfield (born September 3, 1946) is a former American football player and coach. A wide receiver at Florida A&M University in Tallahassee, he was selected by the New England Patriots in the 1970 NFL Draft. Schoolfield served as the head football coach at Fort Valley State University in Fort Valley, Georgia from 1997 to 2002, compiling a record of 48–21.

Head coaching record

References

1946 births
Living people
American football wide receivers
Florida A&M Rattlers football coaches
Florida A&M Rattlers football players
Florida State Seminoles football coaches
Fort Valley State Wildcats football coaches
James Madison Dukes football coaches
New Mexico State Aggies football coaches
North Carolina A&T Aggies football coaches
Pittsburgh Panthers football coaches
Temple Owls football coaches
Sportspeople from Columbus, Ohio
African-American coaches of American football
African-American players of American football
21st-century African-American people
20th-century African-American sportspeople
Players of American football from Columbus, Ohio